Danzangiin Narantungalag (born 29 January 1945) is a Mongolian cross-country skier. He competed in the men's 15 kilometre event at the 1972 Winter Olympics.

References

External links
 

1945 births
Living people
Mongolian male cross-country skiers
Olympic cross-country skiers of Mongolia
Cross-country skiers at the 1972 Winter Olympics
Place of birth missing (living people)
20th-century Mongolian people